Bamboo Creek is a rural locality in the Cassowary Coast Region, Queensland, Australia.

Geography 
The locality is bounded to the north-east by the north branch of the watercourse Bamboo Creek and to east and partly to the south by south branch of Bamboo Creek. The creek is a tributary of the South Johnstone River.

The land use is agricultural and split between crop growing and grazing on native vegetation. The predominant crop is sugarcane, grown mostly in the north and east of the locality.

History 

References 

Cassowary Coast Region
Localities in Queensland